Photha Watthana Senee School  is secondary school for grades 7th through grades 12th. Founded by abbot of Wat Photharam in 1908, Photha is the old public secondary school in the Ratchaburi.

History

Photha Wattana Senee School is the oldest school in Photharam District and the first district school of Thailand. The original study in Potharam temple.

Facts
School Address : 80 village number 8  Hospital-Bankong Road, Klong ta kod Photharam District, Ratchaburi 70120 , Thailand
School Area : Approximately 21.74 Acres
School Abbreviation : P.N.
Type of School : Co-education Secondary School (127 teachers and 2,700 students)
School Motto : (Pali) Nudthi Bhunya Samar R-pha, Wisdom is the brightest of all light

School Emblem
The Ficus religiosa in the circle under the boundary marker of a temple(Sema) and name of school "โพธาวัฒนาเสนี"

School Colors
 Blue is the hardiness.
 Yellow is the exactness.

Schools in Thailand